The 2000 Taça de Portugal Final was the final match of the 1999–2000 Taça de Portugal, the 59th season of the Taça de Portugal, the premier Portuguese football cup competition organized by the Portuguese Football Federation (FPF). The final was played at the Estádio Nacional in Oeiras, and opposed two Primeira Liga sides Porto and Sporting CP. As the inaugural final match finished 1–1, the final was replayed four days later at the same venue with the Dragões defeating the Leões 2–0 to claim their tenth Taça de Portugal.

In Portugal, the final was televised live on TVI. As a result of Porto winning the Taça de Portugal, the Dragões qualified for the 2000 Supertaça Cândido de Oliveira where they took on their cup opponents who won the 1999–2000 Primeira Liga.

Match

Details

Replay

Details

References

2000
1999–2000 in Portuguese football
FC Porto matches
Sporting CP matches